"Prisoners in Paradise" is a 1991 single released by the Swedish rock band Europe. It was the first single from the album of the same name. The single charted at #8 in Sweden.

Track listing
"Prisoners in Paradise"
"Seventh Sign"

Personnel
Joey Tempest − lead vocals
Kee Marcello − guitar, background vocals
John Levén − bass guitar
Mic Michaeli − keyboard, background vocals
Ian Haugland − drums

References

1991 singles
Europe (band) songs
Songs written by Joey Tempest
Song recordings produced by Beau Hill
1991 songs
Epic Records singles